Toronto Bus Terminal may refer to:

Toronto Coach Terminal
Union Station Bus Terminal